The Sammarinese Fascist Party or PFS was a fascist political party that ruled San Marino from 1923 to 1943.

History

The party was founded on 10 August 1922 and led by Giuliano Gozi, a Sammarinese World War I veteran who volunteered in the Royal Italian Army.  The Sammarinese party was modelled directly on the National Fascist Party of the surrounding Kingdom of Italy. Gozi came from a distinguished family and held the posts of Secretary for Foreign Affairs (in San Marino, the foreign secretary leads the cabinet) and Secretary for the Interior; these two offices gave him control of the military and police. From the beginning, the party used violence and intimidation against opponents such as the Socialists. Its party newspaper was the Il Popolo Sammarinese, modelled after the Il Popolo d'Italia. In terms of policy and ideology, the party was not innovative and stuck closely to Italian Fascism. They pursued industrialization which turned a country of mostly farmers into one of factory workers.

In April 1923, Gozi was elected as the first Fascist Captain Regent. After the October elections, both Captains-Regent were Fascists and remained so in subsequent elections for the next two decades as all other political parties were banned in 1926 effectively making San Marino a one-party state. However, independent politicians continued to form a majority in the Grand and General Council until 1932. In addition, the party was split between Gozi's faction and Ezio Balducci's faction, forcing them to look to the Italian party for guidance and mediation.

In 1932, Balducci's faction started a rival newspaper, La Voce del Titano. The next year he was accused of plotting a coup and arrested by Italian authorities after fleeing to Rome. Balducci and other alleged conspirators were purged from the party and tried and sentenced to hard labour in 1934 by a special court but the punishment was never carried out.

In 1942, four years after Italy had enacted the Italian racial laws, Gozi issued Sammarinese racial law n.33, which prohibited interracial marriage, including between Jews and non-Jewish Sammarinese.
The regime did not participate in the deportation of Italian Jews to Nazi held territories, and hosted approximately 100,000 Italian refugees, of whom approximately 1,000 were Jewish, during World War II.

Electoral history

Grand and General Council elections

References

External links

Political parties established in 1922
Fascist parties
Defunct political parties in San Marino
Parties of one-party systems
Banned far-right parties
Anti-communist parties
1922 establishments in San Marino
San Marino in World War II
Sammarinese nationalism